Darwinia taxifolia is a species of flowering plant in the myrtle family Myrtaceae and is endemic to New South Wales. It is an erect or low-lying shrub with laterally compressed leaves. The flowers are pink or purplish and usually arranged in groups of two to four.

Description
Flowering occurs from September to December.

Taxonomy
Darwinia taxifolia was first formally described in 1825 by Allan Cunningham in Geographical Memoirs on New South Wales, based on plant material collected from rocky areas of the Blue Mountains. The specific epithet (taxifolia) means "yew tree-leaved".

In 1962, Barbara G. Briggs described three subspecies in Contributions from the New South Wales National Herbarium, and the names of two are accepted by the Australian Plant Census:

Distribution and habitat
Subspecies macrolaena grows in heath and is found from the Blue Mountains to Nerriga and Tomerong in south-eastern New South Wales, and subspecies taxifolia is restricted to heath on elevated sites in the Blue Mountains.

References

taxifolia
Flora of New South Wales
Plants described in 1825
Taxa named by Allan Cunningham (botanist)